Accounts & SSO, accounts-sso, or lately gSSO is a single sign-on framework for computers.

Originating as part of Maemo 5 Accounts-SSO is free software licensed under LGPL 2.1. Accounts-SSO was deployed as a standard component of Nokia N900, Nokia N9, Tizen, and Ubuntu. Later it was integrated in KDE Plasma Workspaces.

History 

After the MeeGo project ended, Accounts-SSO was transferred into an independent project by Intel. Canonical Ltd then adopted Accounts-SSO for Ubuntu 12.10 (later also Ubuntu Touch) and KDE integrated it in November 2012.

Features 
Among Accounts-SSO's features are a plugin-based architecture, working with diverse user interfaces, storage back-ends, and varying levels of security.

While Accounts-SSO is primarily being used for centralized login management to social networking services, e.g. sharing photos to a service from an image managing application and chatting on the same service from an instant messenger, its plugin-based architecture also allows for local usage, such as disk encryption for which a cryptsetup plugin for Accounts-SSO was developed.

The Accounts-SSO framework consists of several individually released components:
 signond: A daemon providing the SSO service over D-Bus – originally Qt-based, it's being rewritten by Intel using only GLib.
 libaccounts-glib: GLib-based client library for managing the accounts database.
 libaccounts-qt: Client library for managing the accounts database for Qt-based applications – implemented as wrapper around libaccounts-glib.
 libsignon-glib: GLib-based client library for applications handling account authentication through the signond Single Sign-On service.
 signon plugins: A handful of signond authentication plugins are developed within the Accounts-SSO project. Among them plugins for Digest access, OAuth, SASL, and X.509.
 account plugins: The Accounts-SSO project leaves development of plugins for specific services to 3rd parties. Open source plugins for various services (Facebook, Google, Twitter,...) are being developed by Canonical.

See also 

 List of single sign-on implementations

External links 
 
  on Gitlab.com
 
  on Launchpad.net

References 

Identity management
Intel products
Nokia services
Free software programmed in C++